The 2022–23 Saint Louis Billikens women's basketball team represents the Saint Louis University during the 2022–23 NCAA Division I women's basketball season. The Billikens, led by first year head coach Rebecca Tillett, play their home games at the Chaifetz Arena and are members of the Atlantic 10 Conference.

Media
All non-televised Billikens home games and conference road games stream on ESPN+.

Roster

Schedule

|-
!colspan=9 style=| Exhibition

|-
!colspan=9 style=| Non-conference regular season

|-
!colspan=9 style=| Atlantic 10 regular season

|-
!colspan=9 style=| Atlantic 10 Tournament

|-
!colspan=9 style=| NCAA Tournament

Rankings
2022–23 NCAA Division I women's basketball rankings

See also
 2022–23 Saint Louis Billikens men's basketball team

References

Saint Louis
Saint Louis Billikens women's basketball seasons
Saint Louis Billikens women's basketball team
Saint Louis Billikens women's basketball team
Saint Louis